Kabaklı peynirli börek (Turkish: Kabaklı peynirli börek) is a savory Turkish börek made from phyllo and stuffed with a filling made primarily of zucchini and beyaz peynir. Its name is a compound word which derives from "kabak," (Turkish for zucchini), and "börek".

References

Turkish pastries
Cheese dishes